This One's for You is Deez Nuts' second studio album. It was released in April 2010, by Roadrunner Records. All of the instruments and lead vocals were done by JJ Peters, except for a few guest appearances on various tracks. Guest performers on the album are Ben Dunn, Louie Knuxx, Ty Alexander, Stu Callinan, Oli Sykes (Bring Me the Horizon), Jona Weinhofen (I Killed the Prom Queen), Lee Malia (Bring Me the Horizon) and Roman Koester (The Red Shore).

Track listing

Credits 
Roman Koester - bass 
JJ Peters - drums, guitar, vocals
Ty Alexander - drums
Stuart Callinan - guitar
Lee Malia - guitar
Jona Weinhofen - guitar
Ben Coyte - backing vocals
James Hartley - backing vocals
Joel Hamlin - backing vocals
Kevin Cameron - backing vocals
Todd "Louie Knuxx" Williams - backing vocals
Luke Weber - backing vocals
Ben Dunn - vocals
Oliver Sykes - vocals

Charts

References

2010 albums
Deez Nuts (band) albums
Roadrunner Records albums